Makkuva mandal is one of the 34 mandals in Parvathipuram Manyam district of the Indian state of Andhra Pradesh. It is administration under Parvathipuram revenue division and headquartered at Makkuva. The mandal is bounded by Salur mandal on South & West, Parvathipuram mandal on North, Seethanagaram mandal on east and Bobbili mandal on south east. A portion of it also borders the Narayanapatna block of the Koraput district of Odisha on north west.

Demographics 

 census, the mandal had a population of 48,344. The total population constitute, 24,106 males and 24,238 females. The entire population is rural in nature.

Government and politics 

Makkuva mandal is one of the four mandals in Salur (Assembly constituency), which in turn is a part of Araku (Lok Sabha constituency), one of the 25 Lok Sabha constituencies representing Andhra Pradesh. The present MLA is Rajanna Dora Peedika, who won the Andhra Pradesh Legislative Assembly election, 2014 representing YSR Congress Party.

Rural villages
 2011 census of India, the mandal has 48 settlements, consisting of 48 villages.

The settlements in the mandal are listed below:

References

Mandals in Andhra Pradesh